A junction, when discussed in the context of transport, is a location where traffic can change between different routes, directions, or sometimes modes, of travel.

Etymology

The word "junction" derives from Latin iunctus, past participle of iungere, to join.  The word "junction" in this context may also refer to:
The general locality of a given interchange
A specific interchange on a major road, e.g. motorway. This is the common use in the United Kingdom. For example, Milton Keynes is said to be "off junction 13" of the M1.

History

Historically, many cities and market towns developed wherever there was a junction. A road intersection offered opportunities for rest or trade for travellers and merchants. Towns sprang up to accommodate this; the first such in Europe were probably at intersections of the Roman roads.

A similar effect came with the growth of rail transport; so-called railway towns grew up near major railway junctionsoriginally to accommodate railway workers, but expanding into fully functioning settlements over time.

Junctions also developed where different modes of transport intersected, e.g. canal and rail.

Junctions for specific transport modes

See main articles: Junction (road) and Junction (rail).
There are many types of different junction for road transport and rail transport (including metro and rapid transit systems). If many of these are contained in a small area, and where passengers can change from one transport mode to the other in them, it is said to be a transport hub.

Junction types